Corey Schwab (born November 4, 1970) is a Canadian former professional ice hockey goalie. He was drafted in the 10th round, 200th overall in the 1990 NHL Entry Draft by the New Jersey Devils. Schwab won the 2003 Stanley Cup with the New Jersey Devils and the 1995 Calder Cup with the Albany River Rats.

Playing career
Following a three-year WHL career in Seattle, Schwab saw time with the ECHL's Cincinnati Cyclones and the AHL's Utica Devils before settling in with the AHL's Albany River Rats for two seasons. During the 1994-95 season, Schwab was joined by fellow 1990 draftee Mike Dunham between the pipes. While Schwab led the league in goals against average with 2.59, the two combined for the AHL's fewest goals against and were awarded the Harry "Hap" Holmes Memorial Trophy as well as the Jack A. Butterfield Trophy as the playoff MVP's helping the River Rats capture their first Calder Cup title.

The next season, Schwab saw his first action in the NHL when he was called up to New Jersey where he appeared in ten games. At the end of the season, he was traded to the Tampa Bay Lightning, where he stayed for three seasons. He then went out West to the Vancouver Canucks for another brief stay and spent time that year with the AHL's Syracuse Crunch and IHL's Orlando Solar Bears before moving on to play with the IHL's Kansas City Blades in 2000-01.

Schwab began the 2001-02 season at the Toronto Maple Leafs' training camp without a contract. After an impressive pre-season, he was signed to the team as the backup goaltender for Curtis Joseph. Schwab started 30 games for the Leafs and had a career high 12 wins before signing as a free agent in the off-season with the team that originally drafted him back in 1990, the New Jersey Devils.

The return to New Jersey was very timely for Schwab, as the Devils claimed the Stanley Cup in 2003 - the franchise's third title in nine years and Schwab's first as a player.

Schwab's final game was played on January 17, 2004 where he posted a 2–1 overtime victory over the Washington Capitals. Schwab finished his career having played in 147 regular season NHL games amassing 43 wins, 63 losses and 13 ties with a goals against average of 2.89, a save percentage of .896, and 6 shutouts. Schwab appeared in 40 minutes of postseason action over 3 games with the Maple Leafs and Devils stopping all 13 shots he faced.

He served as goaltending development coach and scout for three seasons (2005–08) with the Tampa Bay Lightning. He was the goaltending development coach for the San Jose Sharks (2008-2015). He is currently the goaltending coach for the Arizona Coyotes.

Career statistics

Regular season and playoffs

Awards 
AHL Second All-Star Team (1995)

1995 Calder Cup champion - Albany River Rats

Harry "Hap" Holmes Memorial Award (Fewest goals against - AHL) (1995) (co-winner - Mike Dunham)

Jack A. Butterfield Trophy (Playoff MVP - AHL) (1995) (co-winner - Mike Dunham)

2003 Stanley Cup champion - New Jersey Devils

Transactions 
Traded to Tampa Bay by New Jersey for Jeff Reese, Chicago's 2nd round choice (previously acquired, New Jersey selected Pierre Dagenais) in 1996 Entry Draft and Tampa Bay's 8th round choice (Jay Bertsch) in 1996 Entry Draft, June 22, 1996.

Claimed by Atlanta from Tampa Bay in Expansion Draft, June 25, 1999.

Traded to Vancouver by Atlanta for Vancouver's 4th round choice (Carl Mallette) in 2000 Entry Draft, October 29, 1999.

Signed as a free agent by Toronto, October 1, 2001.

Signed as a free agent by New Jersey, July 8, 2002.
Missed majority of 2003-04 due to groin injury vs. NY Rangers, November 15, 2003 that led to his retirement.

References

External links

1970 births
Albany River Rats players
Arizona Coyotes coaches
Canadian ice hockey goaltenders
Ice hockey people from Saskatchewan
Kansas City Blades players
Living people
New Jersey Devils draft picks
New Jersey Devils players
Sportspeople from North Battleford
San Jose Sharks coaches
Seattle Thunderbirds players
Stanley Cup champions
Tampa Bay Lightning coaches
Tampa Bay Lightning players
Tampa Bay Lightning scouts
Toronto Maple Leafs players
Utica Devils players
Vancouver Canucks players
Canadian ice hockey coaches
Cincinnati Cyclones (ECHL) players
Cleveland Lumberjacks players
Canadian expatriate ice hockey people in the United States